is a Japanese badminton player.

Achievements

Asian Junior Championships
Girls' doubles

BWF International Challenge/Series
Women singles

Women doubles

 BWF International Challenge tournament
 BWF International Series tournament
 BWF Future Series tournament

References

External links 
 

1996 births
Living people
Sportspeople from Saitama Prefecture
Japanese female badminton players
21st-century Japanese women